Crane Meadows National Wildlife Refuge was established in 1992 to preserve a large, natural wetland complex. The refuge is located in central Minnesota and serves as an important stop for many species of migrating birds. Located within a large watershed that includes Rice, Skunk and Mud Lakes, Platte and Skunk Rivers, Rice and Buckman Creeks, and sedge meadow wetlands, it harbors one of the largest nesting populations of greater sandhill cranes in Minnesota. Habitats include native tallgrass prairie, oak savanna, and wetlands with stands of wild rice. Existing ownership lies in Little Falls Township and Agram Township in Morrison County.

The refuge serves as the base for the Federal Partners for Fish and Wildlife Program in Morrison County, which focuses on restoring drained wetlands through voluntary agreements with landowners.

References
website

National Wildlife Refuges in Minnesota
Protected areas of Morrison County, Minnesota
Protected areas established in 1992
Wetlands of Minnesota
Landforms of Morrison County, Minnesota
Meadows in the United States